The 1954 Eastern Kentucky Maroons football team was an American football team that represented Eastern Kentucky State College—now known as Eastern Kentucky University–as a member of the Ohio Valley Conference (OVC) during the 1954 college football season. Led by first-year head coach Glenn Presnell, the Maroons compiled an overall record of 8–1–1 with a mark of 5–0 in conference play, winning the OVC title.

Schedule

References

Eastern Kentucky
Eastern Kentucky Colonels football seasons
Ohio Valley Conference football champion seasons
Eastern Kentucky Maroons football